Black Hours may refer to: 

Black books of hours, a fifteenth century style of illuminated manuscript with black pages
Black Hours, Morgan MS 493, an illuminated manuscript in the Morgan Library
Black Hours, Hispanic Society, New York
Black Hours of Galeazzo Maria Sforza
Black Hours (album), by Hamilton Leithauser